Ismat Zaidi  is a Pakistani actress who has appeared in a variety of television dramas and advertisements.

Filmography

Dramas

References

External links
 

Pakistani television actresses
Pakistani film actresses
Living people
Punjabi people
Year of birth missing (living people)